Blumont is a rural locality in the local government area (LGA) of Dorset in the North-east LGA region of Tasmania. The 2016 census recorded a population of 31 for the state suburb of Blumont.

History 
Blumont was gazetted as a locality in 1964. 

The former North-East Railway opened from Launceston to Scottsdale in 1899, with a station at Blumont. This station was used to load timber harvested in the locality.

Geography
The Brid River forms the north-eastern boundary.

Road infrastructure 
Route B81 (Golconda Road) passes through from south-west to east.

References

Towns in Tasmania
Localities of Dorset Council (Australia)